The Krackhardt E/I Ratio (or variously the E-I Index) is a social network measure which the relative density of internal connections within a social group compared to the number of connections that group has to the external world.  It was so described in a 1988 paper by David Krackhardt and Robert N. Stern noting the increased effectiveness in moments of crisis of organizations which had stronger informal networks that crossed formal internal group structures.

Comparisons with network theory 

The E/I ratio is related to the concept of conductance, which measures the likelihood that a random walk on a subgraph will exit that subgraph.

References 
 Informal networks and organizational crises: An experimental simulation.  David Krackhardt, Robert N. Stern - Social Psychology Quarterly, 1988, DOI:10.2307/2786835

See also 
 Conductance (graph)
 Percolation

Social network analysis